Wellow railway station was a station on the Somerset and Dorset Joint Railway at Wellow in the county of Somerset in England. Opened on 20 July 1874, the station consisted of two platforms, a goods yard and sidings, controlled from an 18 lever signal box.

The station closed to goods in 1963: passenger services were withdrawn when the SDJR closed on 7 March 1966.

The site today

The station building was converted into a house by the artist Peter Blake and his then wife Jann Haworth, in the mid-1970s, during their Brotherhood of Ruralists period. The signalbox at the northern end of the down platform has also been converted for residential use. The station's canopy is still visible from nearby green space where the rail track ran south of the station. The house sports a weather vane with a steam engine finial.

References

Further reading

External links
 Wellow station on SDJR website
 Wellow station and signal box
 Wellow station on navigable 1946 O. S. map

Brotherhood of Ruralists
Disused railway stations in Somerset
Former Somerset and Dorset Joint Railway stations
Railway stations in Great Britain opened in 1874
Railway stations in Great Britain closed in 1966
Beeching closures in England